Jennifer Roberts may refer to:

 Jennifer Roberts (judge), judge of the High Court of England and Wales
 Jennifer Roberts (politician), American politician, businesswoman and diplomat
 Jennifer Roberts (art historian), American art historian